Calleja is a surname found in Spain (as well as countries people of Hispanic descent) and Malta. It is unclear whether the Maltese and Spanish surnames are related or a coincidence, perhaps caused by romanization.

Variations 

Variations in spelling include: 
 Calleia: Anglicized variation of Maltese surname
 Calleya: Variation found in Malta on documents dating from 13th century to 15th century, may be an Italianized variation.
 Callea: Also found in Italy, this variation also shows up on documents from Malta dating from the 15th century
 Kalleya
 Callejas

Spain 
In Spanish, Calleja can be translated to "narrow street" or "alley", but the Latin translation of Calleya is "skillfully". The surname is Castilian, originating in or around Ampuero in Cantabria, Spain.

Malta 
Based on historical evidence, the Maltese version of the surname is likely not related to the Spanish version. The first written appearance of the Calleja surname in Malta predates both Aragonese rule (1283–1412) and Aragonese/Castilian rule (1412–1530) of the Maltese island—appearing in 1271 AD with the spelling Calleya and Caleya.

On May 22, 1271, Bertrando de Real, the magister of Malta, was instructed to keep a note of the names and surnames of those who transported the falcons to the royal court from Malta; Martinus Calleya was a witness and Leo Caleya is among those included in the list. Of note, the persons on the 1271 document belonged to the wealthy class and did not include any serfs or peasants, nor any surnames of Arabic derivation. One theory is that the surname Callea or Calleya in Malta is of late Greek or Byzantine formation—Commendatore Francesco Abela, the father of Maltese history, believed the surname to be of Greek origin.

In the fifteenth century there was a village in Malta called Calleja, situated near Mosta—it seems linguistically and geographically connected with il-Qlejgħa, in the same geographic area. Wied il-Qlejgħa (more popularly known as Chadwick Lakes) means the Valley of the Small Castle.

Another place name in Malta is Il-Qlejgħa, on the Northwest coast. The nearest town to Il-Qlejgħa is Birkirkara, 11.4 km east, which has the highest concentration of people with the surname Calleja.

A hamlet by the name Hal Calleja is known to have existed in the vicinity of Mosta.

Mention of Hal Calleja in Malta based on militia rolls:
 1419 militia roll: total 25 – Naxaru 2, Calleja /Musta 4, Atardu 1, Bircalcara 2, Capurat 3, Pasqualinu 1, Johanni /Buzubudi 2, Zurico 2, Rabat 6, Civitas 2
 1480s militia roll: calleye (27), callea (1), total 28 – Naxar 2, Musta 4, Bercarcara 2, Curmi 7, Luca /Gudia 1, Zurric 2, Sigeui 4, Zebug 3, Rabat 2, Civitas 1

Calleja may refer to

People 
 Alfonso Callejas Deshón, Nicaraguan politician
 Andrés de la Calleja (1705–1785), Spanish painter
 Anthony Callea (born 1982), Australian pop singer of Italian descent
 Benjamín Callejas (born 1990), Chilean handball player
 Carmen Calleja (1949–2012), Spanish politician
 Christian Callejas (born 1978), Uruguayan footballer
 Emma Calleja (born 2003), Actress located in the United States
 Félix María Calleja del Rey, 1st Count of Calderón, Spanish 19th century military officer
 Fernando Callejas Barona (born 1948), Ecuadorian politician
 Gabi Calleja, Maltese gay rights activist
 Isacio Calleja (born 1936), Spanish footballer
 Jaime Callejas (born 1940), Colombian sports shooter
 Javier Calleja (born 1978), Spanish football coach and former player
 José Díez Calleja (born 1962), Spanish footballer
 Joseph Calleia (1897–1975), Maltese-born American singer, composer, screenwriter and actor
 Joseph Calleja (born 1978), Maltese opera singer
 Joseph Calleja (rock) (1974–2000), better known as Joe C., American rapper
 Juan Nicolás Callejas Arroyo (born 1944), Mexican politician
 Kurt Calleja (born 1989), Maltese singer
 Luke Calleja, (born 1985) Australian DJ better known as Kronic
 Marcial Calleja (1863–1914), Filipino politician
 Oreste Calleja (born 1946), Maltese playwright
 Rafael Calleja (1870–1938), Spanish composer
 Rafael Leonardo Callejas Romero (1943–2020), former President of Honduras
 Sebastian Calleja (born 1998), Maltese singer
 Sebastián Calleja (born 1979), Argentine footballer
 Victor Callejas (born 1960), Puerto Rican boxer

Other 
 Calleja de las Flores, tourist attraction in Córdoba, Spain
 Club Callejas, Bolivian football club
 Islands of Calleja, a part of the human brain

References

Maltese-language surnames